
Gmina Łapanów is a rural gmina (administrative district) in Bochnia County, Lesser Poland Voivodeship, in southern Poland.

Villages
Gmina Łapanów contains the villages and settlements of Boczów, Brzezowa, Chrostowa, Cichawka, Grabie, Kamyk, Kępanów, Kobylec, Łapanów, Lubomierz, Sobolów, Tarnawa, Ubrzeż, Wieruszyce, Wola Wieruszycka, Wolica and Zbydniów.

Neighbouring gminas
Gmina Łapanów is bordered by the gminas of Bochnia, Gdów, Jodłownik, Limanowa, Raciechowice and Trzciana.

References
Polish official population figures 2006

Lapanow
Bochnia County